Tahiti and Society Islands mythology comprises the legends, historical tales, and sayings of the ancient people of the Society Islands, consisting of Tahiti, Bora Bora, Raiatea, Huahine, Moorea and other islands. It is considered a variant of a more general Polynesian mythology, developing its own unique character for several centuries. The religion was officially suppressed in the 19th century, and ultimately abandoned by the natives in favor of Christianity.

Prominent figures and terms in Tahiti and Society Islands mythology
Fati
Ro'o-i-Te-Hiripoi
Ta'aroa
Taonoui
Tumu-nui
Māui (Tahitian mythology)
Roua
Rata (Tahitian mythology)
Pahuanui
Pua Tu Tahi
Aremata-Popoa and Aremata-Rorua
'Oro

See also
Polynesian mythology
Ghosts in Polynesian culture

References